Anestis Vlahos (Greece, 7 February 1934 – 23 August 2021) was a Greek actor and politician.

Vlahos died at the age of 87 on 23 August 2021.

Selected filmography
A Girl in Black
Young Aphrodites 
The Man with the Carnation

References

1934 births
2021 deaths
Greek male actors
Greek politicians
PASOK politicians
Greek Macedonians
People from Drama (regional unit)
Greek actor-politicians
Male actors from Athens
Politicians from Athens